Pittman Center is a town in Sevier County, Tennessee, United States. The population was 454 at the 2020 census and 502 at the 2010 census. The town borders Gatlinburg and the Great Smoky Mountains National Park. U.S. 321 passes through the town.

Emert's Cove is situated in Pittman Center, a broad valley along the Middle Fork of the Little Pigeon River.  The Great Smoky Mountains National Park borders Pittman Center to the south, and the town's history and economy are largely intertwined with that of the Smokies.

History

Like much of Sevier County, Emert's Cove was a Cherokee hunting ground before the colonization of the area.  After the Battle of Boyds Creek and several violent incidents between the Cherokee and the settlers to the west in what is now Cocke County, the Cherokee were induced to sign the Treaty of Dumplin Creek in 1785, ceding what is now Sevier County to the State of Franklin.  Among the first Euro-American settlers to move into the newly gained territory was Frederick Emert (1754–1829), who arrived with his family sometime between 1785 and 1793.

Emert was born in Pennsylvania to German immigrants.  He fought in the American Revolution for the Continental Army, and probably saw action at the Battle of Brandywine Creek.  In 2000, the residents of Pittman Center erected the Emert's Cove Covered Bridge in his honor.

Other settlers arrived in Emert's Cove with Emert in 1785. Among them was Johan Martin Shultz (1740-1787), a Revolutionary War surgeon that had served alongside Emert and John Sevier in the "Overmountain Men" in the Battle of King's Mountain. Shultz's son, Martin S.E. Shultz, would go on to marry Emert's daughter, Barbara Ann.

Another important settler was Daniel Wesley Reagan (1803–1892), whose parents and grandparents were among the first settlers in what is now Gatlinburg.  Many residents of Pittman Center are descended from these early settlers.

The Pittman Community Center

In 1910, a survey of Tennessee found Sevier County to be most in need of educational facilities.  In spite of the establishment of a settlement school in Gatlinburg by the Pi Beta Phi fraternity in 1912, education in the region was still appallingly lacking.  To help remedy this situation, Dr. John Burnett, a Methodist minister who visited the Smokies in 1919, envisioned the establishment a large-scale school in the area that would operate with virtually no tuition rates.  Later that year, the Methodist Episcopal Church endorsed Burnett's plan at its annual meeting, and with the help of Reverend Eli Pittman of Elmira, New York, Burnett secured $15,000 for the project.  In 1920, Burnett purchased Garfield Scott's farm just above the confluence of Webb Creek and the Middle Fork of the Little Pigeon River.  This  plot of land would become the core of the new school's campus.

In late 1920, Burnett's new settlement school, which he named "Pittman Community Center" in honor of Reverend Pittman, opened with an enrollment of 100.  The school eventually expanded to include , 15 buildings, and 240 students operating on an annual budget of $9,000.  The buildings included a general store, post office, and a small hospital.  The Pittman School supported itself by canning tomatoes and growing apples, with students doing all the maintenance work.

In 1955, the Sevier County Board of Education purchased the Pittman School, and the school was combined with the Pi Beta Phi High School in Gatlinburg to form Gatlinburg-Pittman High School in 1963.   The only building remaining from the Pittman school is the Home Economics building, which the Methodist Episcopal Church gave to the town after its incorporation for use as its city hall.  In 1996, the building was placed on the National Register of Historic Places.

Municipal incorporation
In 1974 the community incorporated as the town of Pittman Center, which includes both the former Pittman Community Center campus and Emert's Cove.

The Town of Pittman Center provides police services with a police department consisting of a Chief of Police and three full time patrol officers.

Geography

Pittman Center spans most of Emert's Cove, which is located just north of the Greenbrier section of the Smokies.  The cove cuts into Webb Mountain, a low ridge that runs roughly parallel to the national park boundary.  The main section of Pittman Center, which includes its city hall and maintenance buildings, an elementary school, and Burnett Memorial Chapel, is situated just above the confluence of Webb Creek and the Middle Fork of the Little Pigeon at the northern tip of the cove.

Tennessee Route 416, which connects U.S. Route 321 at the park border with U.S. Route 411 in Sevierville, is Pittman Center's main road.  Pittman Center's road signs are distinguished by gold lettering on an olive green background.

Demographics

2020 census

As of the 2020 United States census, there were 454 people, 212 households, and 148 families residing in the town.

2000 census
As of the census of 2000, there were 477 people, 220 households, and 130 families residing in the town. The population density was 79.7 people per square mile (30.8/km2). There were 321 housing units at an average density of 53.6 per square mile (20.7/km2). The racial makeup of the town was 98.74% White, 0.21% African American, 0.21% Native American, 0.21% Asian, and 0.63% from two or more races. Hispanic or Latino of any race were 0.42% of the population.

There were 220 households, out of which 22.3% had children under the age of 18 living with them, 50.0% were married couples living together, 6.4% had a female householder with no husband present, and 40.5% were non-families. 35.0% of all households were made up of individuals, and 12.7% had someone living alone who was 65 years of age or older. The average household size was 2.17 and the average family size was 2.84.

In the town, the population was spread out, with 19.3% under the age of 18, 8.2% from 18 to 24, 23.1% from 25 to 44, 32.5% from 45 to 64, and 17.0% who were 65 years of age or older. The median age was 45 years. For every 100 females, there were 103.0 males. For every 100 females age 18 and over, there were 101.6 males.

The median income for a household in the town was $27,734, and the median income for a family was $35,000. Males had a median income of $31,250 versus $20,714 for females. The per capita income for the town was $19,862. About 7.9% of families and 13.3% of the population were below the poverty line, including 6.9% of those under age 18 and 16.2% of those age 65 or over.

Economy
Pittman Center's economy mainly comes from tourism, being located on the border of the Great Smoky Mountains National Park. The Greenbriar entrance to the national park is located in the town.
 
A golf resort called Bent Creek Golf Village is located in Pittman Center. The golf course was once owned by the Town

Education
Pittman Center is the location of Pittman Center Elementary School.

Gatlinburg-Pittman High School is located less than a mile from the town limits in nearby Gatlinburg which serves the small amount of Pittman Center's high school students.  However, all schools in Sevier County are "county schools" as no municipality in Sevier County operates a separate school system.

Notable people
Dolly Parton - American country music singer, songwriter, actress and businesswoman was born in a one-room cabin in Pittman Center.

References

External links

 
 Municipal Technical Advisory Service entry for Pittman Center — information on local government, elections, and link to charter

Towns in Sevier County, Tennessee
Towns in Tennessee
Communities of the Great Smoky Mountains